Louis Pailhas (2 March 1926 – 6 February 2021) was a French public servant.
From December 1967 to 1982, he was the director-general of the École nationale de l'aviation civile (French civil aviation university).

Biography
Pailhas was born in Foix. After high school studies at the Lycée Pierre-de-Fermat in Toulouse and the classe préparatoire aux grandes écoles at the lycée Louis-le-Grand in Paris, he graduated from the École Polytechnique (X 46) and École nationale de l'aviation civile (IAC 49). He began his career as a civil aviation engineer in Morocco from 1951 to 1956 and then to the board of directors of the direction du secrétariat général de l'aviation civile et commerciale until 1959. The same year he was appointed director of the air navigation regional center of Orly, a position he held until 1965. Deputy Director (1965) of the École nationale de l'aviation civile, he was appointed director of the university in December 1967, the first to hold that position in Toulouse. He resigned in January 1982.
After that, he was nominated air navigation director at the Ministry of Ecology, Sustainable Development, Transport and Housing. He retired in 1990.

In 1998, he was assistant of the Mayor Dominique Baudis for the city of Toulouse and then deputy Mayor for science, aeronautics and space activities in 2001.

From 16 March 2008 till 15 March 2014, he was councillor of Bouilh-Devant.

Louis Pailhas died in Muret on 6 February 2021, twenty four days short of his 95th birthday.

Louis Pailhas was member of the Académie de l'air et de l'espace.

Awards
 Ordre national du Mérite
 Legion of Honour
 Médaille de l'Aéronautique

Bibliography
 Académie nationale de l'air et de l'espace and Lucien Robineau, Les français du ciel, dictionnaire historique, Le Cherche midi, June 2005, 782 p.

References

French aerospace engineers
École Polytechnique alumni
École nationale de l'aviation civile alumni
Corps de l'aviation civile
Corps des ponts
1926 births
2021 deaths
Lycée Pierre-de-Fermat alumni
Lycée Louis-le-Grand alumni
Knights of the Ordre national du Mérite
Chevaliers of the Légion d'honneur
French politicians
Directors of the École nationale de l'aviation civile
Recipients of the Aeronautical Medal